Boljevac Selo is a village in the municipality of Boljevac, Serbia. According to the 2002 census, the village had a population of 315 people.

References

Populated places in Zaječar District